Cyrus Broadwell House is a registered historic building near Newtown, Ohio, listed in the National Register on May 29, 1975.  It was built in 1820 by Cyrus Broadwell (born 1801, died 1879) in the Greek Revival style.  It has 23 columns, 12 feet high and each made from a single pine tree.

Former owners included Hamilton County prosecutor John V. Campbell.

Not to be confused with the Broadwell House of the Cincinnati Country Day School, built ca. 1804 by John Broadwell, located about 5 miles to the north.

Historic Uses 
Single Dwelling

Notes 

Houses on the National Register of Historic Places in Ohio
Houses in Hamilton County, Ohio
National Register of Historic Places in Hamilton County, Ohio
Houses completed in 1820
Greek Revival architecture in Ohio